Lipoid may refer to:

 Lipid, a fatlike substance
 Lipoid proteinosis, also known as Urbach–Wiethe disease